Giovanni Battista Soria (1581 – 22 November 1651) was an Italian architect who lived and worked mostly in Rome.

Tha façades of the church he designed were influenced by the style of Jacopo Barozzi da Vignola and Carlo Maderno.

Soria designed the fountain (c. 1630) at the entrance to the walled garden at the Pontifical University of Saint Thomas Aquinas, Angelicum

Works
San Gregorio Magno al Celio
San Carlo ai Catinari
Santa Maria della Vittoria, Rome
Discovery of Borghese Hermaphroditus
San Crisogono
Santa Caterina a Magnanapoli
San Giuseppe dei Falegnami

Notes

1581 births
1651 deaths
17th-century Italian architects
Italian ecclesiastical architects
Architects from Rome
Italian Baroque architects

es:Giovanni Battista Soria#top